Eminent College of Pharmaceutical Technology (ECPT) is a private pharmacy college located in Moshpukr, Barbaria, Barasat, West Bengal, about 4.8 kilometers from the Barasat Junction railway station and 11.4 kilometers from the Barrackpore Railway Station. It was established in 2017 with its first batch of D. Pharm students and B. Pharm was started next year. It offers a 2 year Diploma in Pharmacy and 4 year Bachelor of Pharmacy courses (Degree). The college is affiliated to Maulana Abul Kalam Azad University of Technology and West Bengal State Council of Technical and Vocational Education and Skill Development and approved by All India Council for Technical Education (AICTE) and PCI

Campus
Eminent College of Pharmaceutical Technology occupies a campus area of 10 bigha. It is home to several architecturally striking buildings where every need of both staff and students is met. Tree-lined avenues and lush lawns dotted with beautiful flowering shrubs soothe the eye and create an ideal learning ambiance. The campus is situated in lap of nature, surrounding with greenery which produces a perfect pollution free & calm environment for learning.

In ECPT a high quality wireless router is being used which receives and decodes the signal very fast. It will send information to the Internet using a secured physical, wired Ethernet connection, so that information remains secret and communication becomes faster. Here students can avail this facility anytime for learning more appropriately by connecting with the world through internet & can enrich their knowledge.

Laboratories
ECPT have well equipped laboratories for the Degree, Diploma curriculum and research. ECPT laboratories are equipped with all the necessary instruments and machines prescribed by the Pharmacy Council of India. UV-Visible spectrophotometer, Colorimeter, Micro-Centrifuge, Nephelometer - Turbidimeter, Flame-Photometer, Refractometer, Polarimeter, Conductivity meter, D.M. Plant, Double Cone Blender, Melting Point Apparatus, Ball Mill Apparatus, Tablet Coating Machine, Tablet Punching Machine, Tablet Hardness Tester, Tablet Counter, Dissolution Test Apparatus, Ampoule Sealing Machine, Projection Microscope, Histamine Chamber, Actophotometer, Student's Organ Bath, Laminar Air Flow etc. are few important instruments available in ECPT laboratories with other necessary instruments for pharmacy courses.

See also

References

External links 
 

Universities and colleges in North 24 Parganas district
Pharmacy schools in India
2017 establishments in West Bengal
Educational institutions established in 2017